Monica Louise "Nikki" Prieto-Teodoro (born March 3, 1966) is a Filipino politician. She is the spouse of Gilbert Teodoro, a former Secretary of the Philippine National Defense. She served as the Philippines special envoy to the UNICEF from September 2017 to September 2018. She was the Representative of the 1st district of Tarlac during the 14th Congress of the Philippines. Teodoro was the Chairperson and Vice-Chairperson of the House Committees on the Welfare of Children and on Population and Family Relations. She helped build Amor Complex, a children's shelter in Tarlac, and the Golden Rooster Foundation that raises funds for underprivileged children.

Education
Teodoro graduated from Webster University Geneva in Switzerland with a degree in International Marketing, where she was trained with the basics of the international economy. She then returned home to become a successful real estate entrepreneur. She also studied in various schools such as Marymount, St. Joseph's School, and Notre Dame in California.

Personal life
She is married to former Defense Secretary Gilbert Teodoro. Before politics and her real estate venture, Teodoro used to be a commercial model. She was a former equestrienne and is a PADI-certified scuba diver.

References 

1966 births
Living people
People from Tarlac
Members of the House of Representatives of the Philippines from Tarlac
Cojuangco family
Filipino people of Spanish descent
Lakas–CMD politicians
Women members of the House of Representatives of the Philippines